The 2019 F4 Spanish Championship was the fourth season of the Spanish F4 Championship. It was a multi-event motor racing championship for open wheel, formula racing cars regulated according to FIA Formula 4 regulations, taking place in Spain. The championship featured drivers competing in 1.4 litre Tatuus-Abarth single seat race cars that conformed to the technical regulations for the championship. The series was organised by RFEDA.

Entry list

Race calendar

The series competed at Circuit Paul Ricard for the first time. The schedule consisted of seven rounds.

Championship

Points were awarded to the top ten classified finishers in races 1 and 3 and for the top eight classified finishers in race 2. No points were awarded for pole position or fastest lap. Race 1 at Paul Ricard only awarded points to the top eight finishers. For Round 6 at Algarve Race 3 was the shorter race, awarding points to the top eight finishers.

Drivers' championship

Rookie Trophy  
Female Trophy F

Teams' championship

References

External links
 

Spanish F4 Championship seasons
Spanish F4
F4 Spanish Championship
Spanish F4